The 2016 LSU Tigers gymnastics team is to represent Louisiana State University in the sport of Artistic gymnastics during the 2016 NCAA Division I women's gymnastics season. The Tigers compete in the Southeastern Conference (SEC). They host their home meets at the Pete Maravich Assembly Center on the university's campus in Baton Rouge, Louisiana. The Tigers program is led by D-D Breaux who has been the head coach of the program for 39 seasons.

Roster 

Head coach: D-D Breaux
Assistant head coach: Jay Clark
Assistant coach: Bob Moore
Volunteer coach: Ashleigh Clare-Kearney

Previous season 
The 2015 Tigers team came into the 2015 season ranked #5 in the Coaches Preseason Poll. They finished the regular season with an almost undefeated run – losing to the Oklahoma Sooners during the Metroplex Challenge, in late January. The Tigers placed second at the SEC Championships, and first at the NCAA Ames Regional. The Tigers advanced to Nationals in Fort Worth, Texas – placing fifth in their session. As a result, the Tigers didn't advance to the Super Six. The program had six participants in the Event Finals also.

Schedule 
LSU's 2016 schedule is a 10-week long regular season – consisting of five home and five away meets. As part of their away meet campaign, the Tigers will participate in the Metroplex Challenge in Fort Worth, Texas (against Missouri, Oklahoma, Stanford and Washington), the Lady Luck Invitational in Las Vegas, NV – a neutral site against NC State, and a quad meet at Texas Woman's against New Hampshire and Oregon State. Tigers will host SEC rivals, Kentucky, Arkansas, Auburn and Alabama – as well as the Oklahoma Sooners to open their 2016 campaign. The Tigers will travel to conference rivals Georgia and Florida.

References 

LSU Tigers women's gymnastics seasons
2016 NCAA women's gymnastics season
2016 in sports in Louisiana